Express Media Group is an Australian magazine publishing company, many of them car magazines.

The company sells over 5 million individual copies each year.

Magazines

The following is the incomplete list of magazines:

 Caravan & Motorhome
 Australian 4WD Action
 Hot4s
 Fast Fours
 Street Commodores
 Street Fords
 Extreme Street
 Xtreme Holdens
 Zoom 
 Performance Imports
 Aussie Brutes
 Scrapbooking Memories
 Australian Patchwork & Quilting
 Handmade
 Modern Home

They also have a financial interest in the companies Tigerz11, 4WD Supa Centre and Roo Systems.

References

External links

Magazine publishing companies of Australia
Companies based in Sydney